
A. R. Natarajan was a disciple of Sri Ramana Maharshi who published numerous books on his guru. He was the president and founder of the Ramana Maharshi Centre for Learning, Bangalore) the Bhagavan Sri Ramana Maharshi Research Centre (Sanjaynagar, Bangalore)and the vice-president of the Ramana Kendra, New Delhi."Bangaloreans would not have had the opportunity of learning about Bhagwan Shri Ramana, but for the efforts put by Shri.A.R.Natarajan in building RMCL at Mekhri Circle, Bangalore" said Mr.Shadakshari, a Great Devotee of Shri.Ramana Maharshi.Shri.A.R.Natarajan was the editor of the journal The Mountain Path, the official Publication of Sri Ramanashramam, Tiruvannamalai.. He authored several books on Sri Ramana Maharshi like "DIVINITY, HERE & NOW".

Bibliography
Timeless in Time: Sri Ramana Maharshi (World Wisdom, 2006) 
Illustrated Stories/Daily Life Incidents of Bhagavan Ramana (Ramana Maharshi Centre for Learning, 2006)
Years in the presence of Ramana My Master (Ramana Maharshi Centre for learning; 01 edition, 2006) 
Holistic Meditation the Straight Path (Sri Ramana Maharshi Research Centre, 2005) 
The Silent Mind ; The Ramana Way (Ramana Maharshi Centre for Learning, 2004) 
Arunachala: From Rigveda To Ramana Maharshi (Amana Maharshi Centre For Learning, 2002) 
Living with Ramana Maharshi (Ramana Maharshi Centre for Learning, 2002) 
Self Discovery : Understanding the Mind ; The Ramana Way (Ramana Maharshi Centre for Learning, 2000) 
Ramana Maharshi ; The Living Guru (Ramana Maharshi Centre for Learning, 2000) 
Ramana Gita (Motilal Banarsidass Publishers P. Ltd., 1999) 
The Hidden Power (Ramana Maharshi Centre for Learning, 1995)
Ramana Maharshi's Miracles: They Happen Everyday First Person Accounts (Ramana Maharshi Centre for Learning, 1995)
Sayings of Sri Ramana Maharshi (Ramana Maharshi Centre for Learning, 1994) 
First Meetings with Ramana Maharshi: First Person Accounts (Ramana Maharshi Centre for Learning, 1994)
Jagadguru Sri Chandrasekhara Bharati Mahaswami: Mystic & seer (Ramana Maharshi Centre for Learning, 1994) 
Inner Circle, The (Ramana Maharshi Centre for Learning, 1994) 
Insights into the Ramana Way (Ramana Maharshi Centre for Learning, 1992)
Meditations the Ramana Way (Ramana Maharshi Centre for Learning, 1991) 
Bhagavan Ramana & Mother (Ramana Maharshi Centre, 1982)

See also
Ramana Maharshi

References

External links
A Tribute A.R. Natarajan
A.R. Natarajan: Life and Work
Ramana Maharshi Centre for Learning

Vedanta
Advaitin philosophers
Indian religious writers
20th-century Hindu philosophers and theologians
Living people
Year of birth missing (living people)